Steve Riley (born June 23, 1958) is an American politician from Kentucky. He is a Republican and represents District 23 in the State House.

References 

Living people
1958 births
Republican Party members of the Kentucky House of Representatives
21st-century American politicians
Place of birth missing (living people)